Blue space (also referred to as blue infrastructure) in urban planning and design comprises all the areas dominated by surface waterbodies or watercourses. In conjunction with greenspace (parks, gardens, etc. specifically: urban open space), it may help in reducing the risks of heat-related illness from high urban temperatures (urban heat island).
Substantial urban waterbodies naturally exist as integral features of the geography of many cities because of their historical development, for example the River Thames in London.

Accessible blue spaces can help revitalizing neighborhoods and promote increased social connectedness as seen on waterfront renovation projects like the Chattanooga Waterfront (Chattanooga, Tennessee),  the CityDeck in Green Bay, Wisconsin, or the Brooklyn Bridge Park in New York City, further enhanced by waterfront festivals such as the Christmas lights in Medellin, in Colombia. Design guidelines promoting healthy buildings -such as, WELL -managed by The International WELL Building Institute™ (IWBI™), or Fitwel -developed and managed by The Center for Active Design (CfAD), recommend incorporating  including and water features as a strategy to improve the health and wellness of the building occupants, and "the 9 foundations of a Healthy Building" -developed at Harvard T.H. Chan School of Public Health-, also recommends indoor access to nature views or nature-inspired elements.

Because neighborhoods with access to attractive natural features are susceptible of gentrification, the social benefits associated with waterbodies can be unequally distributed, with Environmental Justice areas lacking access to good quality blue spaces.

Health benefits of blue spaces
Proximity to water bodies may bring some risks to humans, like water-borne diseases in drinking water, flooding risks, or drowning. But scientific evidence shows that exposure to blue spaces is also associated with a variety of health benefits to those near water bodies. This is described by marine biologist Wallace J. Nichols in his book Blue Mind. Another of the mechanisms by which this phenomenon can be explained is by the Biophilia hypothesis developed by Edward O. Wilson. This theory states that humans have developed a strong connection with nature throughout their evolution that leads to subconscious seeking for natural environments, including green and blue spaces.
Recent research has identified three main pathways that can further explain why proximity to green and blue spaces can be beneficial to health.

Mitigation addresses these health benefits in relationship to the physical improvements that natural environments bring to the built environment, such as reduction of urban heat island, traffic air pollution or traffic noise. 
Instoration focuses on the promotion of physical activity and other positive outcomes associated with increased physical activity and social connectivity promoted by natural spaces. 
Restoration explains how the non-threatening characteristics of the natural environments may reduce negative feelings and increase cognitive restoration.

Effects of blue spaces on physical health

Increased physical activity
A variety of studies have found that people living near coastal areas, are less sedentary  more likely to engage in moderate and vigorous physical activity adequate for health,  which could be explained due to the encouraging presence of walk paths along the coast. Another possible explanation is found in the aesthetical attributes of blue spaces that may motivate individuals to engage in physical activities on blue spaces. But proximity to water bodies alone is not enough to promote increased levels of physical activity, as those bodies need to be accessible to people. A study focusing on teenagers found that those living near beaches that had a major road between their homes and the water body had lower levels of physical activity than those with a direct access to the beach.

Reduced obesity
Blue spaces may reduce obesity as it promotes increased physical activity, and a study suggest that living far from green or waterfront in urban areas may increase the risk of obesity.

Improved respiratory health
Living near blue spaces can improve the quality of life of people with respiratory diseases, such as asthma, which could be explained by the mists and sprays generated by the water movement  as shown on a study measuring the impact in health of green and blue spaces for those with chronic obstructive pulmonary disease (COPD).

Effects of blue spaces on mental health

Improved overall mental health
Researchers found a reduction of psychiatric cases on people living near green or coastal areas. Some of the studies found that ocean exposure or running along river  helped war veterans suffering from PTSD. Others found that engaging in water-related activities such as surfing can help coping with mental health issues and help developing self-confidence and self-reliance skills. A large study looking at links between childhood exposure to blue spaces and adult well-being found that exposure to blue spaces in childhood was associated with better adult well-being.

Improved mood and happiness
Exposure to blue spaces is also linked to increased happiness. A group of researchers studying the effect of green and blue spaces on happiness used a mobile app to track mood feelings of people when they were near water landscapes. The researchers found increased levels of happiness in people near water bodies. Consistently with the findings focusing on physical health, the positive effects on mood associated to blue spaces seem to diminish as the distance between the residence and the water increases.

Improved recovery from drug and alcohol addiction
Educational interventions in blue spaces - such as sailing - have been shown to have positive perceived effects on people undergoing drug and alcohol rehabilitation.

Blue spaces quality assessment tools
In order to understand how blue spaces may influence health-promoting behaviours, a group of researchers that focuses on blue spaces has developed a set of novel tools specifically designed to quantify the quality and potential health benefits of these spaces, risks associated with their use, and environmental quality.  The BlueHealth Environmental Assessment Tool (BEAT) - enables comparable assessment of environmental aspects and attributes that influence access to, use of and health-promoting activities in blue spaces. The tool has been developed to be used by communities and urban/landscape designers.

Blue spaces health effects assessment methods 
Assessing the environmental benefits of a blue space intervention can be done by conducting a Health impact assessment (HIA).

See also
Urban green space
Urban ecology
Urban water management
Green belt
Healthy city
Healthy buildings
Public health
Green infrastructure

References

Urban design
Public health
Rivers
Bodies of water
Coastal and oceanic landforms
Lakes